Jorge Carlos Manicera Fuentes (4 November 1938 – 18 September 2012) was a Uruguayan football defender.

Manicera made 22 appearances for the Uruguay national football team from 1962 to 1967, and played in the 1966 FIFA World Cup.

He died on 18 September 2012, and is buried at Buceo Cemetery.

Clubs
1958-1961 - Rampla Juniors
1962-1966 - Nacional
1967-1970 - Flamengo
1971-???? - CA Cerro

Honours
Uruguayan League - 1963, 1966
Played in 1966 FIFA World Cup

References

1938 births
2012 deaths
Uruguayan footballers
Uruguayan expatriate footballers
Uruguayan Primera División players
Rampla Juniors players
Club Nacional de Football players
C.A. Cerro players
CR Flamengo footballers
Uruguay international footballers
1966 FIFA World Cup players
Expatriate footballers in Brazil
Burials at Cementerio del Buceo, Montevideo
Association football defenders